"Ça m'énerve" is a 2009 electronic novelty song recorded by French singer Helmut Fritz. It was his debut single from his album En observation and was released on 16 March 2009. It was a huge hit in France, where it topped the singles chart. The song was produced by Laurent Konrad, who had previously worked with Discobitch. The radio edit version and the vip dub mix are included on the track listing of the album.

Chart performance
The single was a hit on the French Digital Chart, staying for 10 consecutive weeks at number one. On 21 March 2009, it went to number seven on the SNEP singles chart and reached number-one in its 13th week. It was number-two for ten weeks, becoming the major hit of 2009 in France. As of August 2014, it was the 75th best-selling single of the 21st century in France, with 342,000 units sold.

In Wallonia (Belgium), the single debuted at number 29 on 18 April and reached a peak of number three for four weeks. It peaked at number eight on 24 May in Switzerland and achieved a moderate success in Flanders (Belgium) where it was ranked for seven weeks.

Cover versions
German female singer Ursula Bretzel parodied the song under the title "Ça m'excite". In 2010, Les Enfoirés recorded a cover of the song for their album La Crise de nerfs! ; the singers on this version are Patrick Fiori, Pascal Obispo, Jean-Louis Aubert, Christophe Maé, Kad Merad and Gérard Jugnot for the verses.

In 2020, it was covered by Helmut Fritz himself, singing about the 2020 confinement due to the COVID-19 pandemic.

Track listings
 CD single

 Digital download

Charts and sales

Peak positions

Year-end charts

Certifications

References

External links

2009 debut singles
Helmut Fritz songs
Novelty songs
SNEP Top Singles number-one singles
2009 songs